Countyline, or County Line, is a rural unincorporated community on the Stephens-Carter county line in south central Oklahoma, United States. It is north of State Highway 7. The post office opened June 29, 1928. The ZIP Code is 73425.

References

Unincorporated communities in Carter County, Oklahoma
Unincorporated communities in Stephens County, Oklahoma
Unincorporated communities in Oklahoma